Eros Schiavon (born 24 April 1983) is an Italian footballer who plays as a central midfielder for Sant'Agostino.

Biography
Schiavon made his professional debuts with Belluno, in Serie D. He spent the most part of his career playing for Serie D and Serie C clubs.

In August 2010 he left SPAL to rejoin Portosummaga.

On 23 June 2011 Cittadella signed Schiavon after a successful season at Portosummaga.

In January 2016 Schiavon signs again with SPAL in Lega Pro, third division of Italy. On the 23rd of April with SPAL he wins division three moving up to Serie B after 23 years from the last time.

On 9 August 2018, he joined Serie C side Pro Vercelli for free.

On 7 July 2021, he moved to an amateur side Sant'Agostino.

References

External links

1983 births
Living people
Association football midfielders
Italian footballers
Serie A players
Serie B players
Serie C players
Serie D players
A.C. Belluno 1905 players
Treviso F.B.C. 1993 players
A.S.D. Portogruaro players
S.P.A.L. players
A.S. Cittadella players
U.S. Avellino 1912 players
F.C. Pro Vercelli 1892 players
A.C.N. Siena 1904 players